The Rocky Mountain Athletic Conference women's basketball tournament is the annual conference women's basketball championship tournament for the Rocky Mountain Athletic Conference. The tournament has been held every year since 1995. It is a single-elimination tournament and seeding is based on regular season records.

The winner receives the RMAC's automatic bid to the NCAA Women's Division II Basketball Championship.

Results

 † Black Hills State was declared champion after the championship game was cancelled due to COVID-19 protocols.

Championship appearances by school

 Adams State, New Mexico Highlands, and South Dakota Mines have yet to advance to the RMAC tournament final.
 Dixie State and Western New Mexico never qualified for the RMAC tournament final before departing the conference.
 Schools highlighted in pink are former RMAC members.

See also
RMAC Men's Basketball Shootout

References

NCAA Division II women's basketball conference tournaments
Shootout
Recurring sporting events established in 1995